Aulonemia nitida is a species of Aulonemia bamboo.

It is part of the grass family and endemic to Latin America.

References

nitida